Travis Labhart (born January 20, 1991) is an American football wide receiver who's currently a free agent.

College career

Labhart attended Texas A&M University as a WR. Labhart scored 3 touchdowns in Texas A&M's come from behind win against Duke in the 2013 Chick-fil-A Bowl.

Professional career

Houston Texans
Labhart spent parts of the 2014 NFL season on the Dolphins practice squad and was signed to a future contract for the 2016 season. Labhart was released by the Texans on August 29, 2015, his cut being featured on the HBO series Hard Knocks. In 2014 Labhart made his NFL debut in week four of the preseason and had 3 receptions, including the game winning 2 point conversion catch.

Personal life 
Labhart was also featured on Dude Perfect's NFL Draft Training video special, released April 28, 2014 on Dude Perfect's YouTube channel. The video has gained over 26.7 million views and 149,000 likes as of June, 2022.

In June 2015, Labhart married college sweetheart, Carrie Woodard. The two of them wed in a ceremony before their family, friends, and two children (dogs), Carper Creek Woodard, and Duke John Wayne Labhart.

References

1991 births
American football wide receivers
Houston Texans players
Living people
Texas A&M University alumni
Texas A&M Aggies football players